Hesperagrion is a genus of painted damsels in the damselfly family Coenagrionidae. There are at least two described species in Hesperagrion.

Species
These two species belong to the genus Hesperagrion:
 Hesperagrion heterodoxum (Selys, 1868) (painted damsel)
 † Hesperagrion praevolans Cockerell, 1907

References

Further reading

 
 
 

Coenagrionidae
Articles created by Qbugbot